The Third Kingdom is the thirteenth novel in Terry Goodkind's epic fantasy series The Sword of Truth, continuing the story arc started in The Omen Machine.

Plot summary 
Having survived their encounter with the Hedge Maid, Richard and Kahlan are stranded in the Dark Lands and captured by two cannibals, whom Richard repels with the help of a group of villagers sent by the boy Henrik. These people, led by a woman named Ester, hurry them to a village of caves known as Stroyza. There a young sorceress named Sammie tries to heal Kahlan but becomes hysterical when she discovers that Kahlan contains an active morbid force or 'presence of death', which she also sees in Richard. Henrik reveals that a mob attacked Richard and Kahlan's caravan and that General Meiffert, Cara, Zedd, and Nicci concealed Richard and Kahlan. They fled to divert their attackers while Henrik was ordered to find help. He also reveals that they need a containment field to be healed. The only one they know of is in the People's Palace. They are interrupted by screams and other noises of struggle, and Richard destroys a number of reanimated corpses but the exertion pushes him into unconsciousness.

Sammie heals their minor wounds but is unable to remove the death within. Though Richard awakens, Kahlan remains unconscious, and Sammie tells Richard the story of her family, including the disappearance of her mother and of the duty of the gifted people of Stroyza (which Richard reveals is High D'Haran for 'sentinel'): to watch the north wall beyond which the world of life and the world of death are united. On the other side are a people devoid of souls called the half people, created by the Emperor Sulachan in an ancient war who seek to obtain souls by eating their enemies. To rescue Richard's party, he and Sammie travel to the north wall, fighting several mobs of half people on the way. While trying to find the half people holding Richard's friends they are separated, and Bishop Hannis Arc captures Richard. Meanwhile, Kahlan wakes, and while getting information from Ester she is taken by Abbot Ludwig Dreier and his Mord-Sith Erika to Fajin Province, where he tortures people to the brink of death in an attempt to glean prophecy from them in their last moments.

In the half people's caves, Richard is imprisoned. He discovers Zedd, also imprisoned, who tells him the half people bleed him in the hope that his blood will resurrect their dead emperor. The Bishop uses his Mord-Sith Vika to force Richard into following him and uses Richard's blood to wake the dead Emperor Sulachan. The Bishop and Sulachan then lead the half people out of the third kingdom. Sulachan convinces the Bishop to kill Richard and the Abbot to secure his rule. Hannis Arc decides to send Vika to kill Richard and a band of half people to the Abbey to kill Abbot Dreier. Sammie frees Richard, who then frees his friends, the D'Haran soldiers, and Sammie's mother. While trying to escape, General Meiffert is killed, and Richard, Zedd, Nicci, Cara, and the D'Haran soldiers slaughter the half people left. Vika returns to Hannis Arc empty-handed, and the Emperor sends his trackers after the group. With an army of half people, Sulachan and Hannis Arc head to the People's Palace. Richard and his friends save Kahlan from the Abbey just as Hannis Arc's half people arrive to kill the Abbot, who escapes. Later, Richard and Kahlan say goodbye to Cara as she leaves them to grieve alone.

Characters
Richard Rahl, the Lord Rahl, the leader of the D'Haran Empire, the Seeker of Truth, the wielder of the Sword of Truth, and Kahlan's husband. Main protagonist.
Kahlan Amnell, the Mother Confessor of the Midlands, and Richard's wife.
Zeddicus Zu'l Zorander, "Zedd", the First Wizard, and Richard's maternal grandfather.
Cara, Mord-Sith, Richard Rahl's bodyguard, and General Meiffert's wife.
Nicci, a powerful sorceress once known as Death's Mistress, a former Sister of the Dark, and friend to Richard, Kahlan, and Zedd.
Benjamin Meiffert, Commander General of the First File, and Cara's husband.
Hannis Arc, Bishop of Fajin Province, and ruler of the Dark Lands. Main antagonist.
Samantha, "Sammie", a young sorceress from Stroyza.
Abbot Ludwig Dreier, the second-in-command to Hannis Arc.
Sulachan, Emperor of the half-people, former Emperor of the Old World, and responsible for the weaponization of human beings during the ancient wars, which form the background of the story.
Vika, a Mord-Sith commanded by Hannis Arc.
Erika, a Mord-Sith commanded by Abbot Ludwig Dreier.
Ester, a lady of Stroyza.
Henrik, a young boy.

References

 Goodkind, Terry. The Third Kingdom. New York: Tom Doherty Associates, LLC. 2013.

External links
 Official Terry Goodkind website

The Sword of Truth books
2013 American novels
2013 fantasy novels
American fantasy novels
Tor Books books